North Chungcheong Province (Chungcheongbuk-do) is divided into 3 cities (si) and 8 counties (gun).  The city and county names below are given in English, hangul, and hanja.

Cities

Counties

List by Population and Area

Subdivisions

See also 
Chungcheongbuk-do

References 

Chungcheong, North
Chungcheong, North